Podhale (literally "below the mountain pastures") is Poland's southernmost region, sometimes referred to as the "Polish Highlands". The Podhale is located in the foothills of the Tatra range of the Carpathian mountains. It is the most famous region of the Goral Lands which are a network of historical regions inhabited by Gorals.

Local folklore 
The region is characterized by its unique folklore, which is distinct from other folk cultures in Poland. Its folklore was brought there mainly by settlers from the Lesser Poland region further north and partly by Wallachian (Vlach) settlers in the  centuries during their migrations. The name Podhale literally translates as "below the mountains" in English. The various Goral dialects as well as Polish are spoken in the region.

Regional attractions
Among the region's attractions are the popular mountain resort of Zakopane and the lake known as Morskie Oko ("The Eye of the Sea"), which local legend claims, is connected to the Adriatic by subterranean passageways. Nowy Targ along the Dunajec River, located in the valley beneath the Gorce Mountains, is the capital of the region. Ludzmierz is home to the area's oldest shrine, Our Lady of Ludźmierz also known as the Hostess of Podhale or in Goral Gaździna Podholańsko.

The people in this region are particularly famous for their oscypek, a cheese made from a mix of cow's and sheep's milk, their music, and their ski slopes. In the winter, it is the number one tourist site in Poland.

See also

 Czorsztyn
 Dunajec River Gorge
 Folk costumes of Podhale
 Gorals
 Pieniny
 Polish Tatra Sheepdog
 Niedzica
 Niedzica Castle
 Sanctuary of Our Lady of Ludźmierz
 Szczawnica
 Zakopane Style

References

Geography of Lesser Poland Voivodeship
Highlands